Dimitri Christophe Foulquier (born 23 March 1993) is a professional footballer who plays as a right back for La Liga club Valencia. Born in France, he plays for the Guadeloupe national team.

He spent most of his career in Spain, playing in La Liga for Granada, Getafe and Valencia, having also played in Ligue 1 for Rennes and Strasbourg. He also made three Premier League appearances for Watford.

Foulquier previously represented France up to the under-21 team, before switching to represent Guadeloupe at senior international level.

Club career

Rennes 
Born in Sarcelles, Île-de-France, Foulquier was raised in Capesterre, a commune in the overseas region and department of Guadeloupe. After excelling with local clubs in the commune, he was spotted by Rennes scout Patrick Rampillon and, subsequently, joined the professional club in July 2007.

Foulquier was awarded the Best Academy Player award for the 2009–10 season. After appearing on the bench in matches during the 2010–11 season, he was promoted to the senior team by manager Frédéric Antonetti for the 2011–12 season. He was assigned the number 24 shirt and made his professional debut on 2 October 2011 in a league match against Lille, starting but being replaced at half-time in a 2–0 away loss. He made 22 total appearances, including his UEFA Europa League debut in a 3–1 loss at Atlético Madrid on 15 December, and was sent off on 11 May 2013 in a 4–1 loss at Valenciennes for two yellow cards in the space of three minutes.

Granada 
On 27 August 2013, Foulquier was loaned to La Liga side Granada. He made his debut in the competition on 30 September, replacing Michael Pereira in a 2–0 home win against Athletic Bilbao.

On 25 May 2014, the Andalusians bought Foulquier outright, for a €2 million fee, with the player signing a five-year deal. He scored the only goal of his spell on 24 October 2015, in the third minute of a 1–1 draw with Real Betis at the Nuevo Estadio de Los Cármenes.

Watford 
Foulquier signed for Watford on 25 August 2017, with the club also being owned by the Pozzo family. He was immediately loaned back to his birth country's top league, joining Strasbourg for the season. The early part of his spell was affected by injury.

On 23 August 2018, Foulquier returned to Spain and its first division after agreeing to a one-year loan deal with Getafe. He played 25 times in a 5th-place season that secured Europa League qualification, scoring in consecutive wins at Rayo Vallecano and at home to Betis in October.

Foulquier made his Watford debut on 27 August 2019 in the second round of the EFL Cup, a 3–0 home win over Coventry City. On 21 September he made his Premier League bow, being replaced by Roberto Pereyra after 33 minutes of an 8–0 loss at reigning champions Manchester City; it was 5–0 after 18 minutes.

Granada return 
On 2 January 2020, Foulquier returned to Granada on loan for the rest of the season with the option to buy. He played regularly as the campaign ended in 7th place and European qualification, and scored in a 3–0 win at Osasuna on 23 February. His move was made permanent through a buying option on 24 July, signing him to a three-year contract.

Valencia 
On 30 August 2021, Foulquier signed a four-year deal with Valencia, also in the top tier, for a fee of €2.5 million. He made seven appearances as they finished runners-up in the Copa del Rey, being substituted for Yunus Musah in the 100th minute of the final 1–1 draw with Betis in which his replacement was the only one to miss in the penalty shootout.

International career 
Foulquier was a France youth international, having represented his country at under-18 through under-21 levels, including winning the 2013 FIFA U-20 World Cup, in which he scored in the penalty shoot-out in the final against Uruguay.

Foulquier was called up to the Guadeloupe national team for CONCACAF Nations League match against Curaçao on 19 November 2018. He made his debut as a starter in that game, which Guadeloupe lost 6–0.

Career statistics

Club

Honours 
France U20
FIFA U-20 World Cup: 2013

References

External links 

 Profile at the Valencia CF website
 
 
 
 
 

1993 births
Living people
People from Sarcelles
French people of Guadeloupean descent
Footballers from Val-d'Oise
French footballers
Guadeloupean footballers
Association football defenders
France under-21 international footballers
Guadeloupe international footballers
Ligue 1 players
Championnat National 2 players
Championnat National 3 players
Stade Rennais F.C. players
RC Strasbourg Alsace players
La Liga players
Granada CF footballers
Getafe CF footballers
Valencia CF players
Premier League players
Watford F.C. players
Guadeloupean expatriate footballers
French expatriate footballers
Expatriate footballers in England
Expatriate footballers in Spain
French expatriate sportspeople in England
French expatriate sportspeople in Spain
France youth international footballers